Joseph Murray (1919–2012) was an American plastic surgeon.

Joseph Murray may also refer to:

Sports
 Joseph Murray (1890s footballer), Scottish professional footballer 
 Joseph Murray (footballer, born 1908) (1908–1988), English footballer
 Joe Murray (footballer) (1914–1990), Scottish professional footballer
 Joey Murray (footballer) (born 1971), English former footballer
 Joe Murray (baseball) (1920–2001), American baseball player
 Joe Murray (cyclist) (born 1963), American cyclist
 Joe Murray (British boxer) (born 1987), British boxer
 Joseph Murray (Guyanese boxer) (born 1967), Guyanese boxer
 Joe Murray (rugby league) (1887–1944), Australian rugby league player

Other
 Joseph T. Murray (1834–1907), American abolitionist, manufacturer, inventor
 Joseph Philip Robert Murray (born 1943), Canadian Mounted Police commissioners
 Sir Joseph Murray, 3rd Baronet (1718–1802), soldier of Scottish descent
 Joe Murray (animator) (born 1961), American creator of Rocko's Modern Life and Camp Lazlo
 Joe Murray (British Army soldier) (born 1963), British soldier and television personality
 Joey Murray, member of pop band A Touch of Class

See also 
 Murray (surname)